Axel Patrik Lundqvist (born 1984) is a Swedish politician and member of the Riksdag, the national legislature. A member of the Social Democratic Party, he has represented Gävleborg County since September 2014.

Lundqvist is the son of Per Lundqvist and personnel manager Lena Jernberg. He was educated in Sandviken. He has been a mechanic/crane inspector at Sandvik SMT since 2006. He has been a member of the municipal council in Sandviken Municipality since 2010.

References

1984 births
Living people
Members of the Riksdag 2014–2018
Members of the Riksdag 2018–2022
Members of the Riksdag 2022–2026
Members of the Riksdag from the Social Democrats
People from Sandviken Municipality